Warbreck is a Liverpool City Council Ward in Liverpool, England. It contains the northern parts of the Walton and Orrell Park areas of Liverpool. The population of this ward taken at the 2011 census was 16,481. Its northern part also takes in the old rural district of Warbreck Moor together with the small residential area of Warbreck Park. There is also a "Warbreck" public house within the ward's boundaries situated on Orrell Lane.

Etymology
Warbreck means "look-out hill", from Old Norse varŏi "look-out" and brekka "hill (in the sense 'cairn')". The etymology is the same as that of Warbreck (Lancashire). The place-name was recorded as Varebrikke in 1035.
The ward is home to the salubrious Walton Jail, colloquially known as the Hornby Hotel or the Big House.

Geographical location

Councillors

The ward has returned six Councillors Labour gained two councillors in 2007, one at the May local elections, and one in a by-election held in September 2007 after the death of Cllr Lang. The winner Cllr McLinden successfully defended his seat in May 2008.

 indicates seat up for re-election after boundary changes.

 indicates seat up for re-election.

 indicates change in affiliation.

 indicates seat up for re-election after casual vacancy.

Election results

Elections of the 2010s

Elections of the 2000s 

After the boundary change of 2004 the whole of Liverpool City Council faced election. Three Councillors were returned.

• italics - Denotes the sitting Councillor.
• bold - Denotes the winning candidate.

See also
 Liverpool City Council
 Liverpool City Council elections 1880–present
 Liverpool Town Council elections 1835 - 1879

External links
Ward Profile - Warbreck

References

Wards of Liverpool